Two-photon excitation microscopy (TPEF or 2PEF) is a fluorescence imaging technique that allows imaging of living tissue up to about one millimeter in thickness, with 0.64 μm lateral and 3.35 μm axial spatial resolution. Unlike traditional fluorescence microscopy, in which the excitation wavelength is shorter than the emission wavelength, two-photon excitation requires simultaneous excitation by two photons with longer wavelength than the emitted light. Two-photon excitation microscopy typically uses near-infrared (NIR) excitation light which can also excite fluorescent dyes. However, for each excitation, two photons of NIR light are absorbed. Using infrared light minimizes scattering in the tissue. Due to the multiphoton absorption, the background signal is strongly suppressed. Both effects lead to an increased penetration depth for this technique. Two-photon excitation can be a superior alternative to confocal microscopy due to its deeper tissue penetration, efficient light detection, and reduced photobleaching.

Concept

Two-photon excitation employs two-photon absorption, a concept first described by Maria Goeppert Mayer (1906–1972) in her doctoral dissertation in 1931, and first observed in 1961 in a CaF2:Eu2+ crystal using laser excitation by Wolfgang Kaiser. Isaac Abella showed in 1962 in caesium vapor that two-photon excitation of single atoms is possible.

Two-photon excitation fluorescence microscopy has similarities to other confocal laser microscopy techniques such as laser scanning confocal microscopy and Raman microscopy. These techniques use focused laser beams scanned in a raster pattern to generate images, and both have an optical sectioning effect. Unlike confocal microscopes, multiphoton microscopes do not contain pinhole apertures that give confocal microscopes their optical sectioning quality. The optical sectioning produced by multiphoton microscopes is a result of the point spread function of the excitation: the multiphoton point spread function is typically dumbbell-shaped (longer in the x-y plane), compared to the upright rugby-ball shaped point spread function of confocal microscopes. The concept of two-photon excitation is based on the idea that two photons, of comparably lower photon energy than needed for one photon excitation, can also excite a fluorophore in one quantum event. Each photon carries approximately half the energy necessary to excite the molecule. Excitation results in the subsequent emission of a fluorescence photon with the same quantum yield that would result from conventional single-photon absorption. The emitted photon is typically at a higher energy (shorter wavelength) than either of the two exciting photons. The probability of the near-simultaneous absorption of two photons is extremely low. Therefore, a high peak flux of excitation photons is typically required, usually generated by femtosecond pulsed laser. The purpose of employing the two-photon effect is that the axial spread of the point spread function is substantially lower than for single-photon excitation. As a result, the extent along the z dimension is improved, allowing for thin optical sections to be cut. In addition, in many interesting cases the shape of the spot and its size can be designed to realize specific desired goals. The longer wavelength, lower energy (typically infrared) excitation lasers of multiphoton microscopes are well-suited to use in imaging live cells as they cause less damage than the short-wavelength lasers typically used for single-photon excitation, so cells may be observed for longer periods with fewer toxic effects.

The most commonly used fluorophores have excitation spectra in the 400–500 nm range, whereas the laser used to excite the two-photon fluorescence lies in the ~700–1000 nm (infrared) range produced by Ti-sapphire lasers. If the fluorophore absorbs two infrared photons simultaneously, it will absorb enough energy to be raised into the excited state. The fluorophore will then emit a single photon with a wavelength that depends on the type of fluorophore used (typically in the visible spectrum). Because two photons are absorbed during the excitation of the fluorophore, the probability for fluorescent emission from the fluorophores increases quadratically with the excitation intensity. Therefore, much more two-photon fluorescence is generated where the laser beam is tightly focused than where it is more diffuse. Effectively, excitation is restricted to the tiny focal volume (~1 femtoliter), resulting in a high degree of rejection of out-of-focus objects. This localization of excitation is the key advantage compared to single-photon excitation microscopes, which need to employ elements such as pinholes to reject out-of-focus fluorescence. The fluorescence from the sample is then collected by a high-sensitivity detector, such as a photomultiplier tube. This observed light intensity becomes one pixel in the eventual image; the focal point is scanned throughout a desired region of the sample to form all the pixels of the image.

Development

Two-photon microscopy was pioneered and patented by Winfried Denk and James Strickler in the lab of Watt W. Webb at Cornell University in 1990. They combined the idea of two-photon absorption with the use of a laser scanner. In two-photon excitation microscopy an infrared laser beam is focused through an objective lens. The Ti-sapphire laser normally used has a pulse width of approximately 100 femtoseconds (fs) and a repetition rate of about 80 MHz, allowing the high photon density and flux required for two photon absorption, and is tunable across a wide range of wavelengths. Mode-locked Yb-doped fiber lasers with 325 fs pulses have also been employed for collagen imaging, demonstrating a penetration depth of beyond 320 μm in collagen, which is considerably superior to depths of 250 to 300 μm achievable when coupled to a conventional Ti-sapphire excitation laser.

The use of infrared light to excite fluorophores in light-scattering tissue has added benefits. Longer wavelengths are scattered to a lesser degree than shorter ones, which is a benefit to high-resolution imaging. In addition, these lower-energy photons are less likely to cause damage outside the focal volume. Compared to a confocal microscope, photon detection is much more effective since even scattered photons contribute to the usable signal. These benefits for imaging in scattering tissues were only recognized several years after the invention of two-photon excitation microscopy.

There are several caveats to using two-photon microscopy: The pulsed lasers needed for two-photon excitation are much more expensive than the continuous wave (CW) lasers used in confocal microscopy. The two-photon absorption spectrum of a molecule may vary significantly from its one-photon counterpart. Higher order photodamage becomes a problem and bleaching scales with the square of the laser power, whereas it is linear for single-photon (confocal). For very thin objects such as isolated cells, single-photon (confocal) microscopes can produce images with higher optical resolution due to their shorter excitation wavelengths. In scattering tissue, on the other hand, the superior optical sectioning and light detection capabilities of the two-photon microscope result in better performance.

Applications

Main 
Two-photon microscopy has been involved with numerous fields including: physiology, neurobiology, embryology and tissue engineering. Even thin, nearly transparent tissues (such as skin cells) have been visualized with clear detail due to this technique. Two-photon microscopy's high speed imaging capabilities may also be utilized in noninvasive optical biopsy. In cell biology, two-photon microscopy has been aptly used for producing localized chemical reactions. Using two-photon fluorescence and second-harmonic generation–based microscopy, it was shown that organic porphyrin-type molecules can have different transition dipole moments for two-photon fluorescence and second harmonic generation, which are otherwise thought to occur from the same transition dipole moment. Non-degenerative two-photon excitation, or using 2 photons of unequal wavelengths, was shown to increase the fluorescence of all tested small molecules and fluorescent proteins.

Cancer research

2PEF was also proven to be very valuable for characterizing skin cancer.
It had also been shown to reveal tumor cell arrest, tumor cell-platelet interaction, tumor cell-leukocyte interaction and metastatic colonization processes.

Embryonic research 

2PEF has shown to be advantageous over other techniques, such as confocal microscopy when it comes to long-term live-cell imaging of mammalian embryos.

Kidney research 

2PEF has also been used in visualization of difficult-to-access cell types, especially in regards to kidney cells. It has been used in better understanding fluid dynamics and filtration.

Neurosciences 

2PEF and 3PEF are used to characterize intact neural tissues. In particular, it is advantageous in calcium imaging in a neuron and localized glutamate uncaging

Brain in-vivo imaging 

Multiphoton fluorescence (2PEF and 3PEF) is a useful means of imaging the brain in-vivo. This is because these imaging techniques excel at imaging deep in scattering tissue. Currently, two-photon microscopy is widely used to image the live firing of neurons in model organisms including fruit flies (Drosophila melanogaster), mice (Mus musculus), and zebrafish.

Higher-order excitation
Simultaneous absorption of three or more photons is also possible, allowing for higher order multiphoton excitation microscopy. So-called "three photon excitation fluorecence microscopy" (3PEF) is the most used technique after 2PEF, to which it is complementary.

Dyes and fluorescent proteins for two-photon excitation microscopy
In general, all commonly used fluorescent proteins (CFP, GFP, YFP, RFP) and dyes can be excited in two-photon mode. Two-photon excitation spectra are often considerably broader, making it more difficult to excite fluorophores selectively by switching excitation wavelengths.

Several green, red and NIR emitting dyes (probes and reactive labels) with extremely high 2-photon absorption cross-sections have been reported. Due to the donor-acceptor-donor type structure, squaraine dyes such as Seta-670, Seta-700 and Seta-660 exhibit very high 2-photon absorption (2PA) efficiencies in comparison to other dyes, SeTau-647 and SeTau-665, a new type of squaraine-rotaxane, exhibit extremely high two-photon action cross-sections of up to 10,000 GM in the near IR region, unsurpassed by any other class of organic dyes.

See also
3D optical data storage
Nonlinear optics
Wide-field multiphoton microscopy
Two-photon absorption
 Three-photon microscopy
Second-harmonic imaging microscopy
Two-photon photoelectron spectroscopy

Sources

References

External links
Two-photon suitable dyes
introduction to multiphoton microscopy
Acquisition of Multiple Real-Time Images for Laser Scanning Microscopy (Sanderson microscopy article)
Build Your Own Video-Rate 2-photon Microscope
Two-photon Fluorescence Light Microscopy, ENCYCLOPEDIA OF LIFE SCIENCES
 
 Multiple-photon excitation fluorescence microscopy. University of Wisconsin.
 Fundamentals and Applications in Multiphoton Excitation Microscopy. Nikon MicroscopyU .
 
 

Microscopy
Cell imaging
Fluorescence techniques
Laboratory equipment
Optical microscopy